Gymnarrhenoideae is a subfamily with in the family Asteraceae, with only one tribe, the Gymnarrheneae. Two very different species have been assigned to it, Gymnarrhena micrantha, a winter annual from the deserts of North-Africa and the Middle-East, and Cavea tanguensis, a perennial herb that grows on scree near streams and glaciers in the Eastern Himalayas. These species have very little in common, other than having two types of flower heads and sharing a tendency towards dioecism. Both also have basal leaf rosettes, stretched leaves, with few spaced teeth on the margin, and both lack spines and latex.

Taxonomy 
The subfamily Gymnarrhenoideae and tribe Gymnarrheneae were erected in 2009 by Jose Panero and Vicki Funk to accommodate the isolated position of Gymnarrhena that is suggested by genetic analyses. A later analysis including rare species from China illustrated that Cavea is its sister taxon.

Phylogeny 
Based on recent genetic analysis, it is now generally accepted that the Pertyoideae subfamily is sister to a clade that has as its basal member the Gymnarrhenoideae, and further consists of the Asteroideae, Corymbioideae and Cichorioideae. These three subfamilies share a deletion of nine base-pairs in the ndhF gene which is not present in Gymnarrhena micrantha. Current insights in the relationships of Gymnarrhena to the closest Asterid subfamilies is represented by the following tree.

References 

Asteraceae
Asterales subfamilies